This is a list of cities on the Great Lakes of the United States and Canada, arranged by the body of water on which they are located. Cities with more than 100,000 population are in bold, major cities are italicized.

Lake Superior

 Thunder Bay, Ontario
 Sault Sainte Marie, Ontario
 Grand Marais, Minnesota
 Silver Bay, Minnesota
 Beaver Bay, Minnesota
 Two Harbors, Minnesota
 Duluth, Minnesota
 Superior, Wisconsin
 Bayfield, Wisconsin
 Washburn, Wisconsin
 Ashland, Wisconsin
 Marquette, Michigan
 Munising, Michigan
 Houghton, Michigan
 Sault Sainte Marie, Michigan
 Ontonagon, Michigan

Lake Michigan

 Gladstone, Michigan
 Escanaba, Michigan
 Menominee, Michigan
 Marinette, Wisconsin
 Oconto, Wisconsin
 Green Bay, Wisconsin
 Sturgeon Bay, Wisconsin
 Algoma, Wisconsin
 Kewaunee, Wisconsin
 Two Rivers, Wisconsin
 Manitowoc, Wisconsin
 Sheboygan, Wisconsin
 Port Washington, Wisconsin
 Milwaukee, Wisconsin
 St. Francis, Wisconsin
 Cudahy, Wisconsin
 South Milwaukee, Wisconsin
 Oak Creek, Wisconsin
 Racine, Wisconsin
 Kenosha, Wisconsin
 Waukegan, Illinois
 North Chicago, Illinois
 Lake Forest, Illinois
 Highwood, Illinois
 Highland Park, Illinois
 Evanston, Illinois
 Chicago, Illinois
 Hammond, Indiana
 Whiting, Indiana
 East Chicago, Indiana
 Gary, Indiana
 Portage, Indiana
 Michigan City, Indiana
 New Buffalo, Michigan
 Bridgman, Michigan
 St. Joseph, Michigan
 Benton Harbor, Michigan
 South Haven, Michigan
 Douglas, Michigan
 Saugatuck, Michigan
 Holland, Michigan
 Grand Haven, Michigan
 Ferrysburg, Michigan
 Norton Shores, Michigan
 Muskegon, Michigan
 Ludington, Michigan
 Manistee, Michigan
 Frankfort, Michigan
 Traverse City, Michigan
 Charlevoix, Michigan
 Petoskey, Michigan
 Harbor Springs, Michigan

Lake Huron

 Sarnia, Ontario
 Owen Sound, Ontario
 Penetanguishene, Ontario
 Midland, Ontario
 Wasaga Beach, Ontario
 Collingwood, Ontario
 Parry Sound, Ontario
 Sauble Beach, Ontario
 Cheboygan, Michigan
 Mackinac Island, Michigan
 Mackinaw City, Michigan

Lake Erie
 Kingsville, Ontario
Leamington, Ontario
 Port Colborne
 Monroe, Michigan
 Luna Pier, Michigan
Toledo, Ohio
 Oregon, Ohio
 Port Clinton, Ohio
 Sandusky, Ohio
 Huron, Ohio
 Vermilion, Ohio
 Lorain, Ohio
 Sheffield Lake, Ohio
 Avon Lake, Ohio
 Bay Village, Ohio
Rocky River, Ohio
Lakewood, Ohio
Cleveland, Ohio
Euclid, Ohio
Willowick, Ohio
Eastlake, Ohio
Mentor-on-the-Lake, Ohio
Mentor, Ohio
Ashtabula, Ohio
Conneaut, Ohio
Erie, Pennsylvania
Dunkirk, New York
Lackawanna, New York
Buffalo, New York

Lake Ontario

 Kingston, Ontario
 Belleville, Ontario (Located on Bay of Quinte)
 Oshawa, Ontario
 Whitby, Ontario
 Ajax, Ontario
 Pickering, Ontario
 Toronto, Ontario
 Mississauga, Ontario
 Oakville, Ontario
 Burlington, Ontario
 Hamilton, Ontario
 St. Catharines, Ontario
 Rochester, New York
 Oswego, New York

Cities on rivers or smaller lakes between two Great Lakes

 Sault Ste. Marie, Michigan (St. Marys River)
 Sault Ste. Marie, Ontario (St. Marys River)
 Marysville, Michigan  (St. Clair River)
 St. Clair, Michigan (St. Clair River)
 Marine City, Michigan  (St. Clair River)
 Algonac, Michigan  (St. Clair River)
 New Baltimore, Michigan  (Lake St. Clair)
 St. Clair Shores, Michigan  (Lake St. Clair)
 Grosse Pointe Farms, Michigan  (Lake St. Clair)
 Grosse Pointe, Michigan  (Lake St. Clair)
 Grosse Pointe Park, Michigan  (Lake St. Clair)
 Detroit, Michigan (Detroit River)
 Windsor, Ontario (Detroit River)
 River Rouge, Michigan  (Detroit River)
 Ecorse, Michigan  (Detroit River)
 Wyandotte, Michigan  (Detroit River)
 Riverview, Michigan  (Detroit River)
 Trenton, Michigan (Detroit River)
 Gibraltar, Michigan  (Detroit River)
 Niagara Falls, New York (Niagara River)
 Niagara Falls, Ontario (Niagara River)
 Grosse Ile, Michigan (Detroit River)

See also
List of ports on the Great Lakes

Great Lakes
Great Lakes
Cities